The Russian Public Workers' Association was a political party in Latvia during the inter-war period. Primarily representing Russian civil servants, it was led by Leontin Spolianski.

History
The party was initially known as the Union of Russian Officials or the Party for Communal Activities. It won a single seat in the 2nd Saeima in the 1925 elections, and gained a seat in the 1928 elections, by which time it had become the Russian Public Workers' Association. The 1931 elections saw it reduced back to a single seat in the 4th Saeima.

References

Defunct political parties in Latvia
Russian political parties in Latvia